Regan Hendry (born 21 January 1998) is a Scottish professional footballer who plays as a midfielder for Tranmere Rovers on loan from  club Forest Green Rovers.

Hendry started his career at Raith Rovers, on loan from Celtic until the end of the season, in January 2018. After a second loan spell at Raith during the 2018–19 season, he was released by Celtic at the end of that season and joined Raith on a two-year contract. He won the Scottish League One title and promotion to the Scottish Championship in his first season at the club, and was named in the Championship Team of the Season by PFA Scotland and the SPFL for the following season. He signed for EFL League Two club Forest Green Rovers in summer 2021. Forest Green was promoted to EFL League One as League Two champions in his debut season at the club.

Club career

Early career
Hendry was born in Edinburgh. He started his youth career at Lothian Thistle Hutchison Vale, before joining Celtic at the age of 15, where he signed a three-year contract in 2016.

Raith Rovers
On 2 January 2018, Hendry joined Raith Rovers on loan until the end of the season. He made 11 league appearances for the club over this spell. On 28 September 2018, he returned to Raith Rovers on loan until January 2019, and made a further four league appearances.

Hendry was released by Celtic at the end of the 2018–19 season, and he subsequently signed for Raith on a two-year contract. In a very successful stint with the club, Hendry would win the Scottish League One with Raith, and helped the club in a very impressive season in the Scottish Championship. Hendry would impress in these two seasons, and would be named in the Championship Team of the Season by both PFA Scotland and the SPFL in 2021. He left the club at the end of his contract in summer 2021.

Forest Green Rovers
Hendry signed a two-year contract with EFL League Two club Forest Green Rovers in June 2021. He made his debut for the club on 7 August 2021 in a 2–1 league win over newly-promoted Sutton United, with Hendry providing the assist for Forest Green's late winner. Hendry made 31 league appearances for Forest Green during the 2021–22 season, scoring 3 goals and providing 2 assists as the club won EFL League Two and were promoted to EFL League One for the first time in its history.

On 31 January 2023, Hendry returned to League Two to join Tranmere Rovers on loan until the end of the season.

International career
He has played for Scotland at under-15, under-16 and under-17 levels.

Career statistics

Honours
Raith Rovers
 Scottish League One: 2019–20
 Scottish Challenge Cup: 2019–20

Forest Green Rovers
 EFL League Two: 2021–22

Individual
 PFA Scotland Championship Team of the Year: 2020–21
 SPFL Championship Team of the Season: 2020–21

References

External links

1998 births
Living people
Scottish footballers
Footballers from Edinburgh
Association football midfielders
Scotland youth international footballers
Celtic F.C. players
Raith Rovers F.C. players
Forest Green Rovers F.C. players
Tranmere Rovers F.C. players
Scottish Professional Football League players
English Football League players